Andre Begemann and Florin Mergea were the defending champions but chose not to defend their title.

Rafael Matos and Felipe Meligeni Alves won the title after defeating Luis David Martínez and Andrea Vavassori 6–7(2–7), 6–4, [10–6] in the final.

Seeds

Draw

References

External links
 Main draw

Città di Como Challenger - Doubles
2021 Doubles